Waterfowl production areas (WPAs) are a small component of the National Wildlife Refuge System. The U.S. Fish and Wildlife Service owns, leases, or holds easements on the lands.

References 

National Wildlife Refuges of the United States